James Haines (born October 20, 1954) is an American wrestler. He competed in the men's freestyle 52 kg at the 1976 Summer Olympics.

References

1954 births
Living people
American male sport wrestlers
Olympic wrestlers of the United States
Wrestlers at the 1976 Summer Olympics
People from Arcadia, Wisconsin
Pan American Games medalists in wrestling
Pan American Games silver medalists for the United States
Wrestlers at the 1975 Pan American Games
Medalists at the 1975 Pan American Games
20th-century American people